Thomas Holland may refer to:
 Thomas Holland, 1st Earl of Kent (c. 1314–1360), English nobleman and military commander
 Thomas Holland, 2nd Earl of Kent (1350–1397), English nobleman and councillor to Richard II
 Thomas Holland, 1st Duke of Surrey (1374–1400), also 3rd Earl of Kent
 Thomas Holland (translator) (1549–1612), English Calvinist scholar and theologian
 Thomas Holland (Jesuit) (1600–1642), Catholic priest, Jesuit and martyr
 Thomas Holland (bishop) (1908–1999), Catholic bishop of Salford
 Thomas Holland (1633–1690), namesake of Holland Brook, New Jersey
 Thomas Holland (MP) (died 1618), English merchant and politician who sat in the House of Commons at various times between 1593 and 1614
 Thomas Holland (MP for Anglesey) (1577–1643), of Berw, MP for Anglesey, 1601
 Thomas Erskine Holland, British jurist
 Thomas Henry Holland, British geologist
Thomas Stanley Holland (born 1996), British actor

See also
 Tom Holland (disambiguation)
Thomas Holland House